Okenia leachii is a species of sea slug, a Dorid nudibranch, a marine gastropod mollusc in the family Goniodorididae.

Distribution
This species was first described from Whitburn, North Sea with additional specimens from the Hebrides and Torbay.

Description
This goniodorid nudibranch is translucent white in colour, with brilliant white pigment on the pallial tentacles, rhinophores and gills.

Ecology
Okenia leachii probably feeds on tunicates such as Molgula occulta, family Molgulidae which live buried in muddy sand seabeds.

References

Goniodorididae
Gastropods described in 1855